Isthmus Nahuatl (Isthmus Nahuat; native name: mela'tájto̲l)  is a Nahuatl dialect cluster spoken by about 30,000 people in Veracruz, Mexico. According to Ethnologue 16, the Cosoleacaque dialect is 84% intelligible with Pajapan, and 83% intelligible with Mecayapan.

Communities
It is spoken in the following Veracruzan communities:
 Municipality of Cosoleacaque (settlements of Arroyo el Limón, Bajo Grande, Barrancas (Buenos Aires), Cajiapan, Calzadas (Kilómetro Catorce), Canticas, Cascajal II, Cerro Blanco, Coacotla, Cocal, Colonia Luis Donaldo Colosio, Cosoleacaque, Desviación a San Antonio, Ejido la Bomba, Ejido la Colmena, El Rincón de la Colmena (Sección Carrizal), El Arenal, El Bejarito, El Cascajal, El Colorado, El Conejo, El Coyote, El Gavilán, El Kilómetro Diecisiete, El Limón, El Manguito, El Nacaste, El Nanchital, El Naranjito, El Naranjo, El Oasis, El Palmar, El Piñal, El Potrerillo, El Soriano, El Zapote, Entrada a Zapotal, Estero del Pantano, Fernando Gutiérrez Barrios, Fortín de las Flores, Hermenegildo J. Aldana, José F. Gutiérrez, La Capilla, La Ceiba, La Colmena, La Encantada, La Esperanza, La Lagunita, La Magdalena, Las Carmelitas, Las Palmas, Las Palomas, Lázaro Cárdenas, Loma Bella, Loma de Achota, Lomas de Camalotal, Los Dos Hermanos, Los Mangos, Martín Lancero, Mata las Cañas, Minatitlán, Monte Alto, Monte Grande, Mozapan, Mulato, Nacaste (Las Trancas), Nuevo Cantica (Los Cocos), Ojo de Agua, Paso la Lajilla, Potrero Hermoso, Progreso, Quinta Santa Teresita (Sector Flor de Mayo), Rancho Alegre, Rancho las 3 M, Rincón Sabroso, Rincón de las Palmas, San Antonio, San Judas Tadeo, San Pedro Mártir, Santuario, Tacojalpa, Temoloapan, Tlalixcoya, Tulapan, Zacatal Victoria, and Zapote Negro)
 Municipality of Mecayapan (settlements of Arroyo Texizapan, Cerro de la Palma, El Chaparral, El Diamante (Francisco Méndez Vázquez), El Naranjo, El Palmar (Antonio Sánchez Zarate), El Rubí, Encino Amarillo, Guasinapa, Huazuntlán, Ixhuapan, Juan Morales, La Bocana (Dos Bocas), La Ceiba, La Curva, La Lajilla, La Línea, La Perla del Golfo, Los Arrecifes, Los Cedros, Los Tulipanes, Mario Bautista Luis, Mecayapan, Mecayapan Dos, Omar, Plan Agrario, Rancho Ihueras, San Andrés Chamilpa, and Tonalapa)
Municipality of Pajapan (settlements of 2 Huasteca, Batajapan, Benito Juárez, El Crucero, El Escobar, El Guayabal (Clara Olivera Cruz), El Manantial, El Mangal, El Paraíso (Luis Alberto Yañez), El Pescador (El Moral), El Tulipán (Vicente Matías), El Venado, Familia Cruz, Gustavo Pineda Romero, Jicacal, José María Morelos (Morelos), Las Mangas, Lázaro Cárdenas del Río (Lázaro Cárdenas), Lorenzo Azua Torres, Los Bencomo (San Miguel), Los Martínez, Minzapan, Nanchital, Nancinta, Nuevo Mangal, Pajapan, Palma Real, Playa Linda, San Juan Volador, San Miguel Temoloapan (Nuevo San Miguel), Santa Úrsula (Cesar Ocaña Rueda), Sayultepec, Tecolapa, and Toronjal)
 Municipality of Zaragoza (settlements of Bajo Grande, Campo Nuevo, Carrizal, Cascajal, Colonia Marco Antonio Muñoz, El Laurel, El Roble, El Trébol, Mango Jumuapan, Mangos Salinas, Mangotal, Predio Tapalam, San Martín (Estribillal), San Miguel, Rancho Viejo, Tarcoalolla, Zaragoza)

Phonology
The following description is that of Mecayapan dialect.

Vowels

Consonants

Writing system

H is used at the beginnings of words before u, and has no value of its own. C is used to represent  before the vowels a and o, while qu is used before i and e.

An underline (a̲, e̲, i̱, o̲) is used to mark long vowels.

Stress on the second-last syllable of a word that does not end in l or r, and stress on the last syllable of a word that does end in l or r, is unmarked. All other stress patterns are marked with an acute accent on the stressed vowel (á, é, í, ó).

The letters f, k, v and z occur only in loanwords.

Grammar
This variety of Nahuatl has developed a distinction between inclusive and exclusive "we", which Classical Nahuatl and other modern forms of Nahuatl lack. The exclusive form is regularly derived from the first person singular ("I"), while the inclusive continues the suppletive first person plural of Classical Nahuatl.

References

Bibliography
Wolgemuth, et al. 2000. Diccionario Náhuatl de los municipios Mecayapan y Tatahuicapan de Juárez, Veracruz.
Wolgemuth, Carl. 2002. Gramática Náhuatl (melaʼtájto̱l) de los municipios de Mecayapan y tatahuicapan de Juárez, Veracruz (Segunda edición).
Wolgemuth, Carl. 2007. Nahuatl grammar of the townships of Mecayapan and Tatahuicapan de Juárez, Veracruz. SIL International.

Ando Koji. 2007. Gramática náhuatl de Pajapan, Universidad Veracruzana, Xalapa.

External links

SIL Mexico — includes sound recordings

Nahuatl